Belga is a Belgian news agency which was founded in 1920 as the Agence télégraphique belge de presse by Pierre-Marie Olivier and Maurice Travailleur. The agency was based in Schaerbeek.

References

External links
 

1920 establishments in Belgium
Mass media in Brussels
News agencies based in Belgium
Schaerbeek
Organizations established in 1920
Companies based in Brussels